Warnow-West is an Amt in the district of Rostock, in Mecklenburg-Vorpommern, Germany. The seat of the Amt is in Kritzmow.

The Amt Warnow-West consists of the following municipalities:
 Elmenhorst/Lichtenhagen
 Kritzmow
 Lambrechtshagen
 Papendorf
 Pölchow
 Stäbelow
 Ziesendorf

Ämter in Mecklenburg-Western Pomerania